Sorin Nicușor Rădoi (born 30 June 1985) is a Romanian former professional footballer who played as a right back. He is currently the manager of Farul II Constanța.

Club career
Rădoi's first club was Extensiv Craiova, where he made his debut in the Romanian Liga II in the 2002–03 season.

He left Craiova for one of Bucharest's outsider teams, Sportul Studențesc, with whom he won promotion to the first league. Rădoi played 19 matches for Sportul in the 2004–05 Liga I season.

In the summer of 2005, Rădoi and Sportul Studențesc teammate, Gheorghe Bucur (Liga I top goalscorer at the time), moved to FC Politehnica Timișoara.

In 2008, Rădoi was transferred to U Cluj for whom he played his first match against Rapid București.

Honours

Unirea Urziceni
Liga I: 2008–09

Chindia Târgoviște
Liga III: 2010–11

FC Voluntari
Liga II: 2014–15
Liga III: 2013–14

Viitorul Constanța
Liga I: 2016–17

References

External links
 
 

1985 births
Living people
Sportspeople from Craiova
Romanian footballers
Association football defenders
Liga I players
Liga II players
FC Sportul Studențesc București players
FC Politehnica Timișoara players
FC Universitatea Cluj players
FC Unirea Urziceni players
CSM Unirea Alba Iulia players
AFC Chindia Târgoviște players
FC Voluntari players
FC Viitorul Constanța players
Romanian football managers